This is a list of the number-one hits of 1969 on Italian Hit Parade Singles Chart.

See also
1969 in music
List of number-one hits in Italy

References

1969 in Italian music
1969 record charts
1969